Dr. D Y Patil Medical College, Kolhapur is medical college in Kolhapur, Maharashtra. The college imparts the degree Bachelor of Medicine and Bachelor of Surgery (MBBS). It is recognized by the Medical Council of India. The hospital associated with the college is one of the largest in Kolhapur.

Selection to the college is done on the basis of merit through the National Eligibility and Entrance Test. Yearly undergraduate student intake is 150.

Apart from pediatrics  department and their working hours, other departments and their care is good!

References

External links 
http://dypatilunikop.org/

Medical colleges in Maharashtra
Universities and colleges in Maharashtra
Educational institutions established in 1989
1989 establishments in Maharashtra
Affiliates of Maharashtra University of Health Sciences